The Wilds is a private, non-profit safari park and conservation center that combines conservation science and education programs. The park also offers visitors leisure activities such as ziplining, horseback riding, and fishing. Located in southeastern Muskingum County, Ohio, just west of the village of  Cumberland, the Wilds is home to rare and endangered species from around the globe living in natural, open-range habitats.

The property encompasses  of reclaimed coal mine land and includes  of pastures and a  Carnivore Conservation Center.

The Wilds is the largest wildlife conservation center in North America and is open between the months of May and October.

The Park was made on reclaimed land dug by the dragline Big Muskie.

History

In 1984, the Wilds was incorporated as a 501(c)(3) non-profit under the name The International Center for the Preservation of Wild Animals, Inc. (ICPWA), formalizing a public-private partnership involving the Ohio Departments of Natural Resources and Development, the Ohio Zoos and the private sector that formed in the late-1970s. That same year, the Wilds was gifted its current  from the Central Ohio Coal Company. With a location secured, the Wilds began hiring employees, planning development, and organizing fundraising support.

In 1989, the Johnson Visitor Center was completed, built with the environment in mind using a state-of-the-art geothermal heating and cooling system. In 1990, the first animal management facilities and fencing of the initial open range began. These projects allowed for the Wilds to receive its first animals, Przewalski’s horses in 1992.

The Wilds officially opened to the public for tours in 1994. For the next few years, it continued to add animals, improve and expand conservation efforts, and increase public awareness. In 2001, the Wilds began its partnership with the Columbus Zoo and Aquarium. This culminated in the completion of the first Strategic Vision Plan in 2005, designed to guide the success and future development of the Wilds for the future.

Today, the Wilds continues working on its mission to advance conservation through science, education and personal experience.

Strategic plan
In 2005, the Wilds initiated its long-term strategic plan, which is broken into "strategic centers" to facilitate progress in each field.  These "centers" are based on the Wilds' core values, which include a commitment and respect for nature, social and scientific relevance, and innovative, entrepreneurial and creative approaches to the problem at hand.
The strategic centers are focused on animal management, science and research, conservation education & professional training, land stewardship and habitat management, personal experience, institutional partnerships, and resource development & sustainability.

Conservation

The Wilds is involved in many different conservation methods in an attempt to help reduce the decline of wildlife habitats. These methods range from professional training to animal husbandry to conservation medicine.

In order to help the development of conservation medicine, The Wilds has started three projects they hope will be models for the conservation medicine initiative as a whole. These include assessing water quality and its effects on marine life, comparing animal health parameters in multiple habitats, and evaluating fresh water mussels for diseases, parasites and toxins. Each of these projects is designed to assess the condition of various wildlife and their habitats, and to develop methods to reduce or reverse the destruction of each ecosystem.

Managed species

Gallery

Notes

External links 

Noble County Tourism

Zoos in Ohio
Protected areas of Muskingum County, Ohio
Tourist attractions in Muskingum County, Ohio
Tourist attractions in Guernsey County, Ohio
Tourist attractions in Noble County, Ohio
Zoos established in 1994